Pigeon Run may refer to:

Pigeon Run (Sullivan Branch), a tributary of Sullivan Branch in Sullivan County, Pennsylvania
Pigeon Run, Ohio, an unincorporated community